Buck's Bridge Community Church, also (erroneously) known as Buck's Bridge United Methodist Church, was formerly a Methodist Episcopal church located at Buck's Bridge in St. Lawrence County, New York. The church later more closely followed the Congregational Church polity and theology.  Services are no longer held, as the church closed following the resignation of the last pastor, The Rev. Dennis Lowe.  The final service was December 9, 2018.

The church had worship services Sunday evening at 7:30 PM, with communion on the first Sunday of every month.  Services were seasonal; for instance, the 2013 schedule ended with the December 8 service, to resume the following Palm Sunday in 2014.  Monthly home services for communion were held over the winter.

The church's building was listed on the National Register of Historic Places in 2004.  It was renovated with siding in 2010, keeping the look of white clapboard.

Moving the church to the site of the St. Lawrence Power and Equipment Museum in Madrid, NY, is being considered.

References

Churches on the National Register of Historic Places in New York (state)
Churches completed in 1837
19th-century Methodist church buildings in the United States
Churches in St. Lawrence County, New York
National Register of Historic Places in St. Lawrence County, New York